Batkhuyagiin Khulan is a Mongolian wrestler. She participated at the 2022 Asian Wrestling Championships, being awarded the silver medal in the women's freestyle 53 kg event.

In September 2022, Khulan competed at the 2022 World Wrestling Championships in the women's freestyle 53 kg event. She defeated Jonna Malmgren in the semi-final, but was defeated in the final by Dominique Parrish.

References

External links 

Living people
Place of birth missing (living people)
Mongolian female sport wrestlers
Asian Wrestling Championships medalists
World Wrestling Championships medalists
1999 births
21st-century Mongolian women